, provisional designation  is an eccentric, sub-kilometer sized asteroid, classified as near-Earth object and potentially hazardous asteroid of the Atira group. It is one of the closest orbiting objects to the Sun. While its perihelion lies within the orbit of Mercury its orbital trajectory is highly elliptical, causing its aphelion to cross the orbit of Venus. Therefore, it does not fit the criteria for a vulcanoid or ꞋAylóꞌchaxnim asteroid, which would require it have a wholly intra-Mercurian and intra-Venusian orbit respectively. 

Only the second Atira asteroid to be confirmed,  was at the time of its discovery the asteroid with the smallest known semi-major axis, however it has since been eclipsed in this regard by several other asteroids.

Discovery 
 
 was discovered on 11 May 2004, by leading astronomer Brian Skiff of the Lowell Observatory Near-Earth-Object Search (LONEOS) at Anderson Mesa Station near Flagstaff, United States.

The body's observation arc begins with its official discovery observation at Anderson Mesa, as no precoveries were taken and no prior identifications were made.

Orbit and classification 

It orbits the Sun at a distance of 0.3–1.0 AU once every 6 months (185 days). Its orbit has an eccentricity of 0.53 and an inclination of 19° with respect to the ecliptic.

 is the second known Atira asteroid the first being the group's namesake 163693 Atira which means its entire orbit lies within that of the Earth. Its orbital period is less than that of Venus, making it one of the closest known objects to the Sun, after Mercury. Due to its eccentric orbit, it crosses the orbits of both Mercury and Venus, which also makes it a Mercury- and Venus-crosser.

Physical characteristics 

Based on a generic conversion from absolute magnitude, the asteroid measures between 0.6 and 1.4 kilometers in diameter.

Naming 

As of 2017, this minor planet remains unnamed.

References

External links 
 Asteroid Lightcurve Database (LCDB), query form (info )
 Dictionary of Minor Planet Names, Google books
 Asteroids and comets rotation curves, CdR Observatoire de Genève, Raoul Behrend
 Discovery Circumstances: Numbered Minor Planets (430001)–(435000) Minor Planet Center
 

Atira asteroids
Discoveries by LONEOS
Potentially hazardous asteroids
20040511